Mullah Rezaul Islam is a Jatiya Party (Ershad) politician and the former Member of Parliament of Naogaon-6.

Career
Islam was elected to parliament from Naogaon-6 in 1988.

References

Jatiya Party politicians
Living people
4th Jatiya Sangsad members
Year of birth missing (living people)
People from Naogaon District